Ray Treacy may refer to:
 Ray Treacy (footballer)
 Ray Treacy (track and field)